Thailand women's national under-20 football team participated at the 2004 FIFA U-19 Women's World Championship.

Competitive record

FIFA U-20 Women's World Cup

AFC U-20 Women's Asian Cup

AFF U-19 Women's Championship

AFF Women's Championship

See also
 Thailand women's national football team
 Thailand women's national under-17 football team

References

External links

 Official website
 FIFA profile

Asian women's national under-20 association football teams
U